Tallulah Rose Haddon (born 9 September 1997) is a British actress, drag and performance artist, and model.

Early life
She is the daughter of artist Laura Godfrey-Isaacs and architect Glen Haddon. She attended the private Emanuel School in Battersea.

Career
She played Harriet in the BBC One series The Living and the Dead, Pearl in BBC One's Taboo, and Leila, the lead in Channel 4's Kiss Me First.

Filmography

Film

Television

Theatre

References

External links
Personal website

Living people
British television actresses
British performance artists
British female models
Place of birth missing (living people)
1997 births